DiJonai Carrington (born January 8, 1998) is an American basketball player for the Connecticut Sun. She played college basketball for Stanford and later Baylor before being drafted by the Connecticut Sun in the 2021 WNBA draft.

Early life 
Carrington attended Horizon Christian Academy in San Diego, California. She scored over 2,000 career points for Horizon, while averaging 18.8 ppg, 13.5 rpg, 4.0 apg, and 2.5 spg. She was named a McDonald's All-American and a Jordan Brand Classic All-American. Following her outstanding high school career, she committed to play for Stanford.

College

Stanford
Carrington played 4 years at Stanford. During her time there, she helped the Cardinal win 2 Pac-12 Tournament Championships (2017 and 2019). She also was named to the All Pac-12 Team from both the Coaches and Media in 2019. She was also an outstanding student in the classroom. She was named to the Academic Honor Roll in 2020 and was named to the Pac-12 All-Academic Honorable Mention team in 2018 and 2019

Baylor
Following her time at Stanford, Carrington grad-transferred to Baylor to compete with the Lady Bears. In her one season there, Carrington averaged 14.1 points and 4.9 rebounds per game. She was named Big-12 Newcomer of the Year and also the Sixth Person of the Year.

Stanford and Baylor statistics
Source

WNBA Career

Connecticut Sun
Carrington was the 20th pick in the 2021 WNBA draft by the Connecticut Sun. She attended the Sun training camp and earned one of the Sun's 11 roster spots.

WNBA career statistics

Regular season 

|-
| style="text-align:left;"| 2021
| style="text-align:left;"| Connecticut
| 24 || 1 || 9.2 || .329 || .143 || .733 || 2.0 || 0.5 || 0.5 || 0.1 || 0.9 || 2.8
|-
| style="text-align:left;"| 2022
| style="text-align:left;"| Connecticut
| 36 || 2 || 17.5 || .414 || .306 || .750 || 3.1 || 1.1 || 0.8 || 0.1 || 1.6 || 6.8
|-
| style="text-align:left;"| Career
| style="text-align:left;"| 2 years, 1 team
| 60 || 3 || 14.2 || .389 || .265 || .747 || 2.6 || 0.8 || 0.7 || 0.1 || 1.4 || 5.2

Postseason

|-
| style="text-align:left;"| 2021
| style="text-align:left;"| Connecticut
| 2 || 0 || 0.5 || .000 || .000 || .000 || 0.0 || 0.0 || 0.0 || 0.0 || 0.0 || 0.0
|-
| style="text-align:left;"| 2022
| style="text-align:left;"| Connecticut
| 12 || 0 || 14.6 || .450 || .231 || .700 || 2.7 || 0.8 || 1.0 || 0.2 || 1.3 || 5.9
|-
| style="text-align:left;"| Career
| style="text-align:left;"| 2 years, 1 team
| 14 || 0 || 12.6 || .450 || .231 || .700 || 2.3 || 0.6 || 0.9 || 0.1 || 1.1 || 5.1

Personal life
She is the daughter of former NFL player Darren Carrington.

References

External links
WNBA profile
Baylor Bears Bio
Stanford Cardinal Bio

1998 births
Living people
American women's basketball players
Basketball players from California
Baylor Bears women's basketball players
Connecticut Sun draft picks
Connecticut Sun players
Stanford Cardinal women's basketball players